The District of Columbia Public Schools (DCPS) is the local public school system for Washington, D.C.. It is distinct from the District of Columbia Public Charter Schools (DCPCS), which governs public charter schools in the city.

Composition and enrollment
It is the sole public school district in the District of Columbia.

As of 2013, the District of Columbia Public Schools (DCPS) consisted of 111
of the 238 public elementary and secondary schools and learning centers in Washington, D.C. These schools span prekindergarten to twelfth grade. As of 2000, kindergarten students entered at 5 years old.
School is compulsory for DCPS students between the ages of 5 and 18.
DCPS schools typically start the last Monday in August. The school day generally lasts for about six hours.

The ethnic breakdown of students enrolled in 2014 was 67% Black, 17% Hispanic (of any race), 12% non-Hispanic White, and 4% of other races. As of 2014, the District itself has a population that is 44% White (includes White Hispanics), 49% Black and 10% Hispanic (of any race). Gentrification and demographic changes in many DC neighborhoods has increased the White and Hispanic populations in the city, while reducing the Black population. In 2008, DCPS was 84.4% Black, 9.4% Hispanic (of any race), 4.6% non-Hispanic White, and 1.6% of other races.

Facilities reform legislation in the District of Columbia has led to many school openings and closings. 

As of the 2020–2021 school year, there were 49,896 students and 4,335.12 classroom teachers. As of 2020, the student-to-teacher ratio was 11.51, improved from 13.5 in 2006–07. Student enrollment had peaked at 72,850 students, with a staff totaling 12,000. This sudden DCPS enrollment drop resulted from the Public Education Reform Amendment Act of 2007, which separated District of Columbia Public Charter Schools (DCPCS) from District of Columbia Public Schools.

The District of Columbia passed charter school legislation in 1996, which went into effect in September 1999. The legislation gave the District the power to grant charters for 15 years. Although this is longer than the traditional 3–5 year term observed in 31 other states, a required review occurs every five years. 4.4% of public school students enrolled in a charter school for the 1999 academic school year; the 28 schools had a total enrollment of approx. 3,000 students. After the legislation was enacted in 2007, chartering authority was placed under the D.C. Public Charter School Board and disaffiliated from DCPS. The governance of DCPS was also restructured, and the District was placed under the control of the Mayor. In 2010 about 38% of Washington, D.C. public school students attended 60 charter schools. There are 52 public charter schools in the District, with 93 campuses and 30,000 students. The total number of public charter schools has been reduced from 60 schools on 96 campuses in 2008–09 to 53 schools on 98 campuses as of the 2011–12 school year. However, adding grades to the charter schools is still increasing enrollment and decreasing from DCPS' numbers.

Students

Health
In 2009, 43% of all DCPS public school students were overweight or obese. This was one of the highest rates in the United States.

Dropout rate
In the graduating class of spring 2008, the average freshman graduation rate for DCPS was 56%‚ compared with a national average of 74.9%. This constituted a significant drop from the freshman graduation rate of 68.4% in 2002 and 68.8% as recently as 2005. In just the 2008–09 school year alone, 1,075 Black students dropped out of high school. This figure raises concern since 1,246 students dropped out of DCPS schools that year.
However, these numbers are not meant to be misleading; the 62.8% freshman graduation rate of Black students in 2008 was above the state average.

Governance

Within DCPS, schools are classified as either a "neighborhood school" or a "destination school". Neighborhood schools are elementary or secondary schools assigned to students based on their address. Destination schools are feeder-schools for elementary or secondary institutions from a school a student is already attending. Since the fall of 2009, students may choose a destination school, regardless of their neighborhood location. Locations of all schools and the neighborhood divides can be found on the DCPS website.

For the school year ending in spring 2007, the DCPS was governed by the District of Columbia State Board of Education, with eleven members, including two students who had the right to debate but not to vote. Five members were elected, and the Mayor appointed four. The Board established DCPS policies and employed a superintendent to serve as chief executive officer of the school district, responsible for day-to-day operations. Four Board members represented specific geographical boundaries, and the Board President was elected at large. One condition of the District of Columbia Public Education Reform Amendment Act of 2007 was creating DCPS as a separate cabinet-level agency from the D.C. Board of Education. This moved DCPS within the executive branch of the District of Columbia government—specifically, under Mayoral control. Currently, DCPS is subordinate to District of Columbia Mayor Muriel Bowser. D.C. Mayor Adrian Fenty proposed putting the public schools under the direct control of the Mayor's Office upon taking office in January 2007. However, this reform to District of Columbia Public Schools was encouraged by his predecessor and constituents at large. It also placed all of the District of Columbia public charter schools under the care of a new board—the District of Columbia Public Charter School Board (PCSB). Although these schools were previously a part of DCPS, they are now considered a separate district controlled by the D.C. Public Charter School Board (PCSB).

The D.C. Council passed the Mayor's proposal into law, but since the change amended the Home Rule Act, the change needed to gain federal approval before taking effect. D.C. Delegate Eleanor Holmes Norton introduced H.R. 2080, a bill to amend the D.C. Home Rule Charter Act to provide for the Mayor's proposal. H.R. 2080 was passed by the United States House of Representatives under an expedited procedure on May 8, 2007, by a voice vote. After three U.S. Senators (Ben Cardin of Maryland, Mary Landrieu of Louisiana, and Carl Levin of Michigan) initially placed "holds" on the bill to prevent its consideration in the United States Senate, the Senate agreed to pass H.R. 2080 without amendment on May 22, 2007, by unanimous consent. On May 31, 2007, the bill was presented to the President, and President Bush signed H.R. 2080 into law on June 1, 2007. After the standard Congressional review period expired on June 12, 2007, the Mayor's office had direct control of the Superintendent and the school budget. On June 12, Mayor Fenty appointed Michelle Rhee the new Chancellor, replacing Superintendent Clifford B. Janey.

D.C. School Choice Incentive Act of 2003

In January 2004, Congress passed the D.C. School Choice Incentive Act of 2003. The law established a federally-funded private school voucher program known as the D.C. Opportunity Scholarship Program (OSP). The OSP distributes vouchers to low-income families to cover private school tuition. Because there are more eligible applicants than available vouchers, they are distributed by lottery. In 2010, a randomized controlled trial conducted under the auspices of the Department of Education examined the impacts of the OSP students, finding that it raised graduation rates. Students who were offered vouchers had a graduation rate of 82%, while those who used their vouchers had a graduation rate of 91%. By comparison, the rate for students who did not receive vouchers was only 70%. The study received the Department of Education's highest rating for scientific rigor. Over 90% of the study's participants were African American, and most of the remainder were Latino American. Further research found that students who received vouchers were 25% more likely to enroll in college than students with similar demographic characteristics who did not receive vouchers.

D.C. Public Education Reform Amendment Act of 2007
The Council of the District of Columbia enacted the DC Public Education Reform Amendment Act of 2007. This act established a DC public school agency based on authority given to the council in the District of Columbia Home Rule Act of 1973. The Department of Education that was established under the Mayor triggered several changes. The largest was already discussed—DCPCS gained sole authority over chartering and chartered schools, DCPS became subordinate to the Mayor's office. Secondly, many more minor authoritative changes took place. The first is that the State Education Office (SEO) became the State Superintendent of Education (OSSE). The four subsections of the District were reaffirmed through location-based State Board of Education selectees. In addition, the smaller eight school election wards were reaffirmed. Finally, the commission was established through this legislature. The "Commission" is the Interagency Collaboration and Services Integration Commission, which includes the Mayor, Chair of the Council of the District of Columbia, Chief Judge of the D.C. Superior Family Court, Superintendent of Education, Chancellor of DCPS, Chair of DCPCSB, and fourteen others.
After the 2007–2008 school year, about one-fifth of the teachers and one-third of the principals resigned, retired, or were terminated from DCPS. DCPS initially experienced a powerful negative impact due to the loss. A GAO-conducted study
recommended that the Mayor direct DCPS to establish planning processes for strikes and look to performance reviews from central offices to strengthen accountability. These recommendations were followed, and accountability has increased through academic and financial report generation. Increased accountability made way for other small reforms. One example is implementing a requirement that students entering ninth grade sit down with a school counselor and construct a course plan to reach graduation.

River Terrace Elementary School and Shaed Education Campus shut their doors at the end of the 2010–2011 and 2011–2012 school years, respectively. Students attending River Terrace and Emery Education Campus moved to the Langley Building. In 2019, a proposal was submitted to close Metropolitan High School, an alternative school.

No Child Left Behind compliance
In accordance with Section 1116, a provision of the No Child Left Behind Act (NCLB), entitled "Academic Assessment and Local Education Agency and School Improvement", the Office of the State Superintendent of Education (OSSE) of the District of Columbia oversees compliance with Adequate Yearly Progress (AYP). A large portion of meeting AYP is based on standardized-tests performance; the District used the summative assessment called the District of Columbia Comprehensive Assessment System ("DC CAS") through the 2013–2014 school year, after which it switched to tools from the Partnership for Assessment of Readiness for College and Careers (PARCC) and the National Center and State Collaborative (NCSC).

Many schools fail to meet AYP, even though DCPS educators offer support and tools to students to be academically successful. DCPS has created an evaluation tool to assess schools by more than their standardized test scores. They call this a Quality School Review, which uses the Effective Schools Framework to assess schools through rubrics on topics such as classroom observations, interviews with parents, students, teachers, and school leadership, staff surveys and reviewing artifacts (i.e., handbooks, student work). In 2007, Karin Hess of the National Center for the Improvement of Educational Assessment conducted an analysis that has also gone into the alignment of DCPS standards and the "DC CAS Alt", the assessment for students with cognitive disabilities.

Budget
According to the U.S. Census Bureau, DCPS had a budget of $1.2 billion and spent $29,409 per pupil in FY 2009–10.

In 1989–90, DCPS reported spending $10,200 (1999 adj. dollars) per pupil. A decade later, in 1999–2000, its reported per-pupil expenditures had increased to $11,500. However, those figures likely underreport DCPS's actual total per-pupil expenditures. In 2012, the Cato Institute's Andrew J. Coulson showed that DCPS's reported per-pupil expenditures figures were based on incomplete data. That year, the U.S. Census Bureau had reported that DCPS's 2008–09 per-pupil expenditures were $18,181, but DCPS officials had neglected to include about $400 million in spending. Informed by Coulson's observations, the U.S. Census Bureau revised its data collection methods and reported that per-pupil expenditures were $28,170. Those revisions are reflected in the Bureau's 2009–10 reports. 

In FY 2009–2010, the District received 6.7% of its total elementary and secondary education revenues from federal sources.

Statistics
In 2008, in terms of testing 36% of students demonstrated proficiency in mathematics and 39% demonstrated proficiency in reading.

The average educator was paid $67,000 in 2010. A contract signed in 2010 was expected to raise that figure to $81,000 in 2012.

Schools and locations
All DCPS schools are located in the District of Columbia.

Many of the District's public schools are undergoing evolving relationships with the central office as they seek to compete for students leaving the system for charter schools. According to school choice researcher Erin Dillon, "In its winning application for federal Race to the Top funds, DCPS, for example, touted its three models for autonomous schools: The aptly named 'Autonomous Schools,' which are granted autonomy as a reward for high performance; 'Partnership Schools,' which are run by outside organizations that are granted autonomy in the hope of dramatically improving performance; and the 'D.C. Collaborative for Change,' or DC3, a joint effort of some of the District's highest- and lowest-performing schools that have been granted autonomy as a tool for innovating with curriculum and professional development. (Meanwhile, highly autonomous charter schools, a growing presence in the District of Columbia, educate almost 40 percent of the city's public school students.)"

High schools

Traditional high schools

Selective high schools

Middle schools

Elementary schools

Education campuses

Alternative and citywide schools

Leaders
Below is a partial list of superintendents and chancellors of the D.C. Public School system. The head of the school system was known as "Superintendent" until June 2007, when the post was renamed "Chancellor".

Graduation scandal
In 2018, WAMU and NPR reported that an reported increase in graduation rates had been inflated by high schools who granted diplomas to students who should have failed, according to city law. According to The Washington Post, only 46 percent of the school district's public school students were on track to graduate in 2018 after the school system began to adhere to stricter attendance policies.

See also

 List of parochial and private schools in Washington, D.C.
 Susan E. W. Fuller, artist, first instructor of art in the District's public schools

References

External links

District of Columbia Public Schools boundary maps
Special Section: District of Columbia Public Education Documents: Agreements, Audits, Reports, Requests, etc., by Erich Martel

 
School districts in the United States
Public education in Washington, D.C.
Public Schools
1805 establishments in Washington, D.C.